Marco Di Loreto (born 28 September 1974) is an Italian former footballer turned manager. He has played over 200 matches at Italian Serie A since his debut at age 26.

He has been the former head coach of Lega Pro Seconda Divisione club Castel Rigone.

Coaching career
In March 2011 he was appointed as the coach of Berretti youth team of Foligno Calcio. In July 2011, he obtained a UEFA A License, making him eligible to coach Lega Pro teams.

He then served as youth coach at Perugia for the 2012–13 season.

He has been the head coach of Castel Rigone in the Lega Pro Seconda Divisione league in the 2013–14 season until the end of October 2013.

Honours
Serie D: 1996
UEFA Intertoto Cup: 2003

References

External links
 
 Profile at La Gazzetta dello Sport (2006-07)  
 Profile at La Gazzetta dello Sport (2007-08)  
 Profile at Lega-Calcio.it 
 

Italian footballers
Italian football managers
Serie A players
Serie B players
Serie D players
S.S. Arezzo players
A.C. Perugia Calcio players
ACF Fiorentina players
Torino F.C. players
Association football central defenders
People from Terni
1974 births
Living people
Footballers from Umbria
Sportspeople from the Province of Terni